The 2021–22 FIU Panthers men's basketball team represented Florida International University in the 2021–22 NCAA Division I men's basketball season. The Panthers, led by fourth-year head coach Jeremy Ballard, played their home games at Ocean Bank Convocation Center in Miami, Florida as members of the East Division of Conference USA.

Previous season
The Panthers finished the 2020–21 season 9–17, 2–15 in C-USA play to finish in last place in East Division. Their season ended with their withdrawal from the C-USA tournament due to positive COVID-19 tests within the program.

Offseason

Departures

Incoming transfers

Recruiting class of 2021

Recruiting class of 2022

Roster

Schedule and results

|-
!colspan=9 style=| Regular season

|-
!colspan=9 style=| Conference USA tournament

Source

References

FIU Panthers men's basketball seasons
FIU Panthers
FIU Panthers men's basketball
FIU Panthers men's basketball